Colaranea melanoviridis is a species of orb-weaver spider that is endemic to New Zealand.



Taxonomy 
Colaranea brunnea was described in 1988 by David J. Court and Raymond Robert Forster.

Description 
Colaranea brunnea has a chocolate brown colouration, but has a notable white band going down the dorsal side of its abdomen. Excluding the legs, females are about 6.1mm in length whereas males are about 5.1mm in length. C. brunnea live in forest habitat.

References 

Araneidae
Spiders of New Zealand
Spiders described in 1988
Endemic fauna of New Zealand
Endemic spiders of New Zealand